South Dakota Highway 239 (SD 239) is a  state highway located entirely within McPherson County, South Dakota. Its southern terminus is at an intersection with SD 10/SD 45. Its northern terminus is at 106th Street in the small community of Long Lake.

Route description
SD 239 begins at an intersection with SD 10 / SD 45 south of Long Lake. Here, the roadway continues to the south as 350th Avenue. It travels to the north. Approximately  later, SD 239 curves slightly east to bypass a small lake. It then curves back to the west and straightens out to a due north course for the last  before it terminates at 106th Stree on the south side of Long Lake. SD 239 then becomes 350th Avenue after this terminus, which continues to the North Dakota state line.

Major intersections

References

 

239
Transportation in McPherson County, South Dakota